As a result of the Alhambra Decree of 1492 and the religious repression by the Holy Office of the Inquisition, many Sephardim (Spanish and Portuguese Jews) left the Iberian peninsula at the end of the 15th century and throughout the 16th century, in search of religious freedom. Some migrated to the newly independent Dutch provinces which welcomed the Sephardic Jews.  Many of the Jews who left for the Dutch provinces were crypto-Jews, persons who had converted to Catholicism but continued to practice Judaism in secret. After they had settled in the safety of the Netherlands, many of them 'returned' fully to practice of the Jewish religion.

State of community prior to large scale migration 
Many Jewish refugees came from Portugal, where Spanish Jews had fled after the Spanish Inquisition had been introduced in Spain in 1478, followed by the expulsion of the Jews from Spain in 1492. In 1497, the Portuguese forcibly converted all Jews in Portugal, including many who had returned to Judaism after fleeing Spain and its Inquisition. Following the establishment in 1536 of the Portuguese Inquisition, descendants of Jews who had converted to Catholicism dating back to a forced conversion in Spain in 1391 through the Portuguese forced conversion, were looked upon with great suspicion. In search of greater religious and economic freedoms, many crypto-Jews left Portugal for places with more lenient religious legislation and opportunities where their unique skill-sets could thrive. Many left for Brazil (where Europeans were Portuguese speaking) and France. A couple of decades later, groups of crypto-Jews started reaching the Dutch Republic.

Migration to Amsterdam 
Amsterdam became one of the most favored destinations in the Netherlands for Sephardic Jews. Because many of the refugees were traders, Amsterdam benefited greatly from their arrival. However, the reason to settle in Amsterdam was not merely voluntary; many crypto-Jews, or Marranos, had been refused admission in trading centers like Middelburg and Haarlem, and because of that ended up in Amsterdam. Under the influence of Sephardic Jews, Amsterdam grew rapidly. Many Jews supported the House of Orange, and were in return protected by the stadholder.

Relationship with Amsterdam officials 

Many types of discriminatory laws commonplace elsewhere and previously in medieval times were not in place in Amsterdam; to the extent such laws were on the books, they weren't always followed strictly. In part, such general religious toleration arose before Jews came to Amsterdam, as city officials adopted a policy of freedom of conscience in joining the Union of Utrecht. Despite voiced challenges toward the loose legislation tolerating Jews, Burgomasters continued to enact laws tailored to their own pragmatic vision of society, even if they were contrary to popular opinion disfavoring Jews. Much of the toleration expressed by the Amsterdam officials was rooted in the economic assets the new Portuguese Jewish community could provide, as well as the officials’ lack of prior experience with Jewish residents. These factors made Amsterdam officials and even residents less susceptible to labeling the entire Jewish community by their negatively perceived history in Christian tradition. While the Jews of Amsterdam enjoyed greater freedoms in the religious and economic spheres of everyday life, which helped them assimilate more quickly and efficiently into Amsterdam society, they were denied certain political privileges, like participation in municipal government.

Religious identity and community in Amsterdam 

The Jewish community of Amsterdam was self-governing, with the Imposta board overseeing communal and individual conduct until the establishment of the unified Mahamad committee in 1639, seven prominent individuals who had final say over all that happened among the Jewish community.  The Mahamad was self-sustaining, with members appointing their own successors, thus keeping the communal power in the hands of the merchant elite among the Portuguese Jews.  Besides providing for and overseeing the institutions of Sephardic Jewry in Amsterdam, the Mahamad also closely controlled the process of re-judaization - that is helping those whose families had been secretly living as Jews while being outwardly Catholic return to a full Jewish life.  In this process, several individuals rejected Rabbinic Judaism or advanced ideas outside of the norms of Judaism at that time and were disciplined by the Mahamad through the process of herem, which could be anything from denial of Torah honors to an outright ban on the individual.  The most famous of those to receive a full ban herem was philosopher Baruch Spinoza, whose intellectual contributions were very important in his time and continue to influence thinkers to this day.

Commerce

International commerce 
The migration of Jews from Portugal and Spain to many places other than Amsterdam allowed them to build a strong international trading network that was unique to diaspora members. Because of the business and family relations many Amsterdam Jews had in light of their former community’s dispersal, they established trading connections with the Levant and Morocco. For instance, the Jewish-Moroccan merchant Samuel Pallache (ca. 1550-1616) was sent to the Dutch Republic by Sultan Zidan Abu Maali of Morocco in 1608 to be his ambassador at The Hague. In particular, the relations between the Dutch and South America were established by Sephardic Jews; they contributed to the establishment of the Dutch West Indies Company in 1621, and some of them were members of its directorate. The ambitious schemes of the Dutch for the conquest of Brazil were carried into effect through Francisco Ribeiro, a Portuguese captain, who is said to have had Jewish relations in Holland. After the Dutch in Brazil appealed to Holland for craftsmen of all kinds, many Jews went to Brazil; about 600 Jews left Amsterdam in 1642, accompanied by two distinguished scholars — Isaac Aboab da Fonseca and Moses Raphael de Aguilar. In the struggle between Holland and Portugal for the possession of Brazil, the Dutch were supported by the Jews. The Jews of Amsterdam also established commercial relations with various countries in Europe. In a letter dated November 25, 1622, King Christian IV of Denmark invited Jews from Amsterdam to settle in Glückstadt, where, among other privileges, the free exercise of their religion would be assured to them.

Commerce and occupations in Amsterdam 
Besides merchants, a great number of physicians were among the Spanish and Portuguese Jews in Amsterdam, including Samuel Abravanel, David Nieto, Elijah Montalto, and the Bueno family. Joseph Bueno was consulted in the illness of Maurice of Nassau, Prince of Orange (April, 1623). Jews were admitted as students at the university, where they studied medicine as the only branch of science which was of practical use to them, for they were not permitted to practise law, and the oath they would be compelled to take excluded them from the professorships. Neither were Jews taken into the trade guilds: a resolution passed by the city of Amsterdam in 1632 excluded them. Exceptions, however, were made in the case of trades which stood in peculiar relations to their religion: printing, bookselling, the selling of meat, poultry, groceries, and drugs. Jews tended to involve themselves in newer industries in Amsterdam, like the importation of colonial products, that just so happened to not have as many guild restrictions attached to them. In 1655, a Jew was permitted to establish a sugar refinery. Jews also became heavily involved in the jewelry and tobacco industries. While occupational status did not differ greatly between Jews and the rest of the Amsterdam population, Jews were far more concentrated in particular lines of commerce.

Decline 
The migration of Sephardic Jews from the Netherlands to the Caribbean Antilles began in the mid-17th century, after the Dutch fleet captured the island of Curaçao from the Spaniards in 1634. One generation later, several waves of migrant Jewish and Protestant families from the Netherlands had established a shipping and trading settlement in Willemstad, a natural harbour controlled by the Dutch West Indies Company. The Dutch troops lost the Brazilian colony of Recife to the Portuguese in 1654, which forced many Dutch Sephardic refugees from Brazil to move to Curaçao or to the colony of New Amsterdam (Manhattan).

By the 1680s, the Portuguese Sephardic Community of Amsterdam started to decline, in spite of having built a new synagogue, the monumental Esnoga, which was inaugurated in 1675. With the Netherlands experiencing economic difficulty (in part due to loss of New World colonies) some Jews left and immigration slowed. The Ashkenazic community became the larger Jewish community in Amsterdam, even as the Sephardic Jews kept positions of power and remained the significantly wealthier community. The process of emancipation, granting Jews full Dutch citizenship in the late 18th and early 19th century, continued the erosion of power the Mahamad held over the community.

Holocaust
On the eve of the Holocaust, there were approximately 4,300 Sephardic Jews living in the Netherlands, of a total Jewish population of some 140,000 (3%). After the war, the Sephardic community had declined to some 800 people, 20% of the pre-war population. The Holocaust meant the end of the Sephardic community in The Hague; it ended after the war as most of the community was murdered by the Nazis in  concentration camps.

Today
 
Nowadays, the Sephardic community in the Netherlands, called the Portugees-Israëlitisch Kerkgenootschap (PIK) (Portuguese-Israelite Religious Community), has a membership of some 270 families (translating to approximately 600 persons), and is concentrated in Amsterdam. They constitute now some 2% of the Dutch-Jewish community. The PIK also has a youth movement, J-PIG (Jongeren Portugees-Israëlitische Gemeente - Youth Portuguese-Israelite Community).

Amsterdam is still home to works of its once vibrant Sephardic community. The Portuguese Synagogue or Esnoga, which was inaugurated in 1675, is located at the heart of Amsterdam's Jewish Cultural Quarter and it is still in use today. The venerable Library Ets Haim - Livraria Montezinos was founded in 1616 and it is the oldest functioning Jewish library in the world. Also, the Sephardic cemetery Beth Haim in Ouderkerk aan de Amstel, a village on the outskirts of Amsterdam, has been in use since 1614 and is the oldest Jewish cemetery in the Netherlands. Another reminder of the Sephardic community in Amsterdam is the Huis de Pinto, a residence for the wealthy Sephardic family de Pinto, constructed in 1680.

Notable Dutch Sephardic Jews
Abraham Blauvelt, a 17th century Jewish pirate, privateer, and explorer of Central America and the western Caribbean, after whom the towns of Bluefields, Nicaragua, and Bluefields, Jamaica, were both named
David de Aaron de Sola – rabbi and author (1796–1860)
Abraham Cohen Pimentel – rabbi Amsterdam Synagogue (died 1697)
Jacob Abendana – rabbi and philosopher (1630–1695)
Jacob Israel Belmonte – poet, co-founder of the Sephardic community of Amsterdam (1570–1629)
Isaac Aboab da Fonseca – rabbi, kabbalist, scholar, writer (February 1, 1605 – April 4, 1693)
Hedy d'Ancona – female politician, well-known feminist (October 1, 1937)
Abraham Bueno de Mesquita – comedian, actor (July 23, 1918 – August 19, 2005)
Benjamin Cardozo – Associate Justice of the Supreme Court of the United States (May 24, 1870 – July 9, 1938)
Uri Coronel – sports director and chairman of Ajax Amsterdam (December 24, 1946 – July 18, 2016)
Daniel De Leon – American Socialist leader (December 14, 1852 – May 11, 1914)
Isaac da Costa – poet (January 14, 1798 – April 28, 1860)
Manasseh ben Israel – rabbi, influential in the readmission of the Jews to England (1604–1657)
Samuel Jessurun de Mesquita – graphic artist, mentor of M. C. Escher (June 6, 1868 – February 11, 1944, Auschwitz)
Abraham Lopes Cardozo – hazzan of Congregation Shearith Israel (1914–2006)
George Maduro – resistance fighter, distinguished officer (July 15, 1916 – February 9, 1945, Dachau concentration camp)
Balthazar (Isaac) Orobio de Castro – philosopher (1617–1687)
Samuel Pallache – Moroccan envoy to the Dutch Republic, co-founder of the Sephardic community of Amsterdam (ca. 1550–1616)
Samuel Sarphati – physician, city planner (1813–1866)
Baruch Spinoza – philosopher and optician (November 24, 1632 – February 21, 1677)
Jacob Tirado – merchant and shipowner, co-founder of the Sephardic community of Amsterdam (ca. 1540–1620)
Joseph de la Vega – author, poet and economist (1650–1692)
Isaac de Pinto – merchant/banker, political philosopher (1717–1780)
Joseph Teixeira de Mattos – watercolor painter and pastellist (1892–1971)
Joseph Mendes da Costa – sculptor and teacher (1863–1939)
Rehuel Lobatto – mathematician (1797–1866)
Nathan Lopes Cardozo - contemporary rabbi, philosopher and scholar of Judaism

Persons of partial Dutch Sephardic Jewish descent
Frieda Belinfante – cellist and conductor, Jewish father (May 10, 1904 – April 26, 1995)
Neve Campbell – Canadian actress, daughter of an Amsterdam-born mother of Sephardic Jewish descent (October 3, 1973)
Abraham Pais – particle physicist, science historian, Sephardic father, Ashkenazi mother (May 19, 1918 – July 28, 2000)
Ophir Pines-Paz – Israeli politician, Dutch-Sephardic father (July 11, 1961)

See also
 Golden age of Jewish culture in Spain
 History of the Jews in Amsterdam
 History of the Jews in Portugal
 History of the Jews in Spain
 History of the Jews in the Netherlands
 Jews in Turkey

Notes

Sources
Bodian, Miriam, Hebrews of the Portuguese Nation: Conversos and Community in Early Modern Amsterdam: Indiana University Press 1999
da Silva Rosa, J. S., Geschiedenis der Portugeesche Joden te Amsterdam 1593-1925 (History of the Portuguese Jews in Amsterdam 1593-1925): Amsterdam 1925 (Dutch)
Katchen, Aaron L., Christian Hebraists and Dutch Rabbis: Seventeenth Century Apologetics and the Study of Maimonides' Mishneh Torah: Harvard University Press 1985
Sorkin, David, Beyond the east-west divide: rethinking the narrative of the Jews’ political status in Europe, 1600–1750: Jewish History 2000
Swetschinski, Daniel M., Reluctant Cosmopolitans: The Portuguese Jews Of Seventeenth-century Amsterdam: Littman Library of Jewish Civilisation 2004
Tammes, Peter., “Hack, Pack, Sack”: Occupational Structure, Status, and Mobility of Jews in Amsterdam, 1851–1941: Journal of Interdisciplinary History 2012

External links
 The Portuguese Jewish Community of Amsterdam
 Jewish Historical Museum

 
 
Jewish Dutch history
Netherlands
Middle Eastern diaspora in the Netherlands
Netherlands
Spanish-Jewish diaspora in Europe
Portuguese-Jewish diaspora in Europe
 
Religion in the Dutch Republic
Jewish Portuguese history